The Social Science Journal is a quarterly peer-reviewed academic journal covering social science. It was established in 1963 as The Rocky Mountain Social Science Journal, obtaining its current name in 1976. The journal is published by Elsevier on behalf of the Western Social Science Association, of which it is the official journal. The editor-in-chief is Stephanie Witt (Boise State University).

Abstracting and indexing
According to the Journal Citation Reports, the journal has a 2017 impact factor of 1.010.

See also

 List of social science journals

References

External links

Elsevier academic journals
English-language journals
Multidisciplinary social science journals
Publications established in 1963
Quarterly journals